The 2017–18 ASUN Conference men's basketball season with practices in October 2017, followed by the start of the 2017–18 NCAA Division I men's basketball season in November. Conference play began in January 2018 and concluded in February 2018. The season marked the 40th season of ASUN Conference basketball.

Florida Gulf Coast won the regular season championship by two games over Lipscomb. The ASUN tournament was held from February 26 through March 4 at campus sites as top seeds hosted each round. Lipscomb defeated Florida Gulf Coast in the championship game to win the tournament championship. As a result, Lipscomb received the conference's automatic bid to the NCAA tournament. FCGU earned an invite to the NIT.

Lipscomb received the 15th seed in the West Region of the NCAA Tournament and was defeated by the second-seeded North Carolina Tar Heels in the first round. FGCU received the 7th seed in the USC bracket of the NIT and was defeated by the second-seeded Oklahoma State Cowboys in the first round of the tournament.

Conference matrix

Points scored

Conference regular season

Through February 23, 2017

All-Atlantic Sun Awards
Source

Postseason

References